Henry Proctor (19 October 1929 – 13 April 2005) was an American competition rower and Olympic champion. He was later a military officer and retired as colonel in 1971. Proctor won a gold medal in coxed eights at the 1952 Summer Olympics, as a member of the American team.

References

1929 births
2005 deaths
American male rowers
Rowers at the 1952 Summer Olympics
Olympic gold medalists for the United States in rowing
Medalists at the 1952 Summer Olympics